Austin Lloyd Fleming, MC (7 August 1894 – 26 January 1969) was a Canadian flying ace of the First World War. He was credited with eight aerial victories.

Early life
Austin Lloyd Fleming was born on 7 August 1894 in Toronto, Ontario. His parents were Lydia Jane Orford and Robert John Fleming. He was a stockbroker before the First World War.

First World War
After joining military service on 10 November 1916, Fleming transferred from the Duke of Cornwall's Light Infantry to the General List of the Royal Flying Corps on 13 May 1917. He was appointed as a flying officer, with the rank of second lieutenant on probation on 16 May 1917, signifying that he had completed pilot's training. On 8 June 1917, he was assigned to No. 46 Squadron RFC. He was reassigned to No. 111 Squadron RFC in Palestine later that year, following a "friendly fire" incident in which an aircraft from No. 1 Squadron RFC was shot down and the pilot, Second Lieutenant Tom Littler, was killed.

Between 17 January and 12 April 1918, Fleming scored eight aerial victories (listed below). His exploits gained him the Military Cross, although the award citation did not recognize all his feats. The award was gazetted on 13 May 1918, reading:

On 11 September 1918, Fleming was injured.

List of aerial victories

Second World War, retirement and death
On 1 June 1919, Fleming was transferred to the unemployed list of the Royal Air Force, ending his service. He subsequently spent some years in the United States before moving to Britain.

With the advent of the Second World War, Fleming returned to military service in the Royal Air Force. On 1 September 1939, he appointed as a flight lieutenant. He served until 1 August 1942, when he once again gave up his commission and left the RAF.

In 1959, Fleming presented No. 111 Squadron a souvenir machine gun taken from the reconnaissance craft he captured on 29 January 1918.

Fleming died in Málaga, Spain, on 26 January 1969. He was buried in Mount Pleasant Cemetery, Toronto, and survived by his wife, Helen Hyde Fleming, and twin children, Bob and Louis.

Notes

References
 Above the Trenches: A Complete Record of the Fighter Aces and Units of the British Empire Air Forces 1915–1920. Christopher F. Shores, Norman L. R. Franks, Russell Guest. Grub Street, 1990. , .
 Bristol F2 Fighter Aces of World War I: Volume 79 of Aircraft of the Aces: Volume 79 of Osprey Aircraft of the Aces. Jon Guttman, Harry Dempsey. Osprey Publishing, 2007. , .

1894 births
1969 deaths
Burials at Mount Pleasant Cemetery, Toronto
British Army personnel of World War I
Canadian stockbrokers
Canadian World War I flying aces
Duke of Cornwall's Light Infantry officers
People from Old Toronto
Recipients of the Military Cross
Royal Air Force officers
Royal Air Force personnel of World War II
Royal Flying Corps officers
Military personnel from Toronto